The 2015–16 Northwestern Wildcats women's basketball team will represent Northwestern University during the 2015–16 NCAA Division I women's basketball season. The Wildcats, led by eighth year head coach Joe McKeown, play their home games at the Welsh-Ryan Arena and were members of the Big Ten Conference. They finished the season 18–17, 4–14 in Big Ten play to finish in twelfth place. They advanced to the semifinals of the Big Ten women's tournament where they lost to Maryland. They were invited to the Women's National Invitation Tournament where they lost to San Diego in the first round.

Roster

Schedule

|-
!colspan=9 style="background:#431F81; color:#FFFFFF;"| Exhibition

|-
!colspan=9 style="background:#431F81; color:#FFFFFF;"| Non-conference regular season

|-
!colspan=9 style="background:#431F81; color:#FFFFFF;"| Big Ten regular season

|-
!colspan=9 style="background:#431F81;"|Big Ten Women's Tournament

|-
!colspan=9 style="background:#431F81;"|WNIT

Rankings

See also
2015–16 Northwestern Wildcats men's basketball team

References

Northwestern Wildcats women's basketball seasons
Northwestern
2016 Women's National Invitation Tournament participants
Northwestern Wild
Northwestern Wild